The Liverpool County Premier League is a football competition based in Merseyside, England. It was founded in 2006 as a merger of the Liverpool County Football Combination and the I Zingari League.

The league has three divisions, the Premier Division, Division One and Division Two. The Premier Division sits at step 7 (or level 11) of the National League System and is a feeder league to the North West Counties League Division One North and South.

Champions

2022–23 members

Premier Division

 Admiral Park
 BRNESC
 East Villa 
 FC Orient 
 Halewood Apollo 
 Liver Academy 
 Liverpool NALGO 
 MSB Woolton 
 Old Xaverians
 Sefton Athletic 
St Helens Town
 The Frames
 Warbreck
Waterloo Dock

Division One

 Alumni 
 FC Garston 
 FC Salle
 Flatt House
Formby
 Joey Orr's
 Netherley Woodlane Legion FC
 Roby College Old Boys 
 ROMA 
 Springwood
 St Helens Town Reserves 
 The ARC
 The Naylo
 Waterloo Grammar School Old  Boys

Division Two

 BRNESC Reserves
 Edge Hill Boys Club Old Boys 
 FC King Harry 
 Granby Toxteth Athletic 
 Mags Reed Park (withdrew August 2022)
 MSB Woolton Reserves
 River Junior OA
 Salisbury FC

References

External links
 Liverpool County F.A. Premier League Official Website
 Liverpool County Premier League on Full-time

 
2006 establishments in England
Sports competitions in Liverpool
Football leagues in England
Sports leagues established in 2006
Football in Merseyside